The Genesis Scottish Open is a professional golf tournament in Scotland, and is one of five tournaments that are part of the Rolex Series, which identifies it as one of the European Tour's premier events. It has been played on various courses, but in recent years it has been played on a links course, appealing to players who wish to gain experience before the Open, which takes place in the following week.

Since 1987 it has, together with John Deere Classic, been the last chance to qualify for The Open. It has been part of the Open Qualifying Series since that series started in 2014. The leading 3 players (4 in 2016) not already qualified, have received an entry to the Open. Before 2014 there was generally an exemption category so that the leading player or players, not already qualified, could play in the Open.

The Scottish Open became a Rolex Series event in 2017 (when the series was inaugurated), which meant the prize fund was increased to $7 million. Beginning in 2022, the tournament was co-sanctioned by the PGA Tour and title sponsored by Genesis.

History

1972 and 1973
The first Sunbeam Electric Scottish Open was part of the 1972 European Tour and was held at Downfield Golf Club in Dundee. Neil Coles beat Brian Huggett at the second hole of a sudden-death playoff, holing a 12-foot putt. Total prize money was £10,000 with a first prize of £2,000. Sunbeam Electric had sponsored the Sunbeam Electric Tournament in 1971.

In 1973 the event was played on the Old Course at St Andrews. Graham Marsh won by 6 strokes from Peter Oosterhuis. Total prize money was increased to £15,000 with a first prize of £2,500.

Both 1972 and 1973 tournaments were broadcast extensively on ITV. The tournament was cancelled when television coverage could not be arranged in 1974.

1986 revival
The event returned to the European Tour calendar in 1986 when, under a new sponsorship deal with Bell's, the Glasgow Open, which had been held at Haggs Castle Golf Club from 1983 to 1985, was rebranded as the Scottish Open. After remaining at Haggs Castle for the first year, the tournament moved to Gleneagles in 1987 and was played the week before the Open Championship. 1987 also saw the BBC broadcast live coverage of the event, and continued to do so until 1993. It remained at Gleneagles until Bell's withdrew their sponsorship in 1994 following the switch of TV coverage from BBC to SKY that year. In 1995 and 1996 it was held, without a sponsor, at Carnoustie.

The 1986 event had prize money of £130,000 with a first prize of £21,660. This rose to £200,000 with a first prize of £33,330 for the 1987 event at Gleneagles. This had risen to £600,000 and a first prize of £100,000 for the 1992 tournament. Despite the loss of Bell's sponsorship the prize money increased to £650,000 in 1995 but, with the event losing money, this was reduced to £480,000 in 1996.

Loch Lomond
From 1997 the Scottish Open's pre-Open place on the European Tour schedule was taken by the Loch Lomond World Invitational, which had been first held at Loch Lomond Golf Club in September 1996. The top-60 in the World Rankings were invited but few non-Europeans entered. The event was broadcast by the BBC. From 1997 to 2000 the Loch Lomond event was played the week before the Open Championship. These events did not use the Scottish Open name, the rights to which were owned by ISM. From 2001, it was decided that the Loch Lomond event would be known as the Scottish Open and all prior editions, including the September 1996 event, would be granted Scottish Open status. This resulted in the anomaly of there being two "Scottish Opens" in 1996. The September 1996 event had a first prize of £125,000, rising to £133,330 in 1997 and £183,330 by 2000.

The 2001 Scottish Open was run without a main sponsor but from 2002 it was known as the Barclays Scottish Open, and was played at Loch Lomond until 2010. Some concern was expressed that the course, which is very different from the links courses on which the Open Championship is played, put European Tour players at a disadvantage compared to their leading rivals from the PGA Tour, who traditionally spent a week practising for the Open on links courses in Ireland.

Links courses
In 2011 it was held at Castle Stuart Golf Links, near Inverness, due to the financial difficulties being suffered by Loch Lomond. Play was reduced to 54 holes (three rounds) in the tournament due to heavy rain, which caused flooding and landslides. Aberdeen Asset Management took over sponsorship in 2012, but the event remained at Castle Stuart in 2012 and 2013 before moving to Royal Aberdeen Golf Club in 2014. It was played at Gullane Golf Club in 2015 and at Castle Stuart Golf Links in 2016. In 2016, the attendance figures at Castle Stuart were disappointing, with a reduction of more than 20,000 to 41,809 over the four tournament days. In 2017 it was held in Ayrshire, for the first time in its current guise, at Dundonald Links, and was played at Gullane again in 2018. Since 2019 the event has been held at the Renaissance Club and is scheduled to remain there until 2026.

Disability Event

From 2019, a 36-hole EDGA (European Disabled Golf Association) Scottish Open event of ten players takes place on the same course on the Saturday and Sunday morning of the main event.

Winners

Sources:

Previous event of same name

In 1935 Gleneagles hosted a Scottish Open Championship held on the King's course. Total prize money was £750. The R&A objected to the use of the term "Championship" being used for a tournament organised by a private enterprise. Percy Alliss won the tournament by 4 strokes from Jack Busson with an aggregate of 273. The 1936 tournament was sponsored by Penfold and known as the Penfold Scottish Open. Penfold had sponsored tournaments in Wales and England from 1932 to 1934. The tournament was played at Ayr Belleisle Golf Club. Total prize money was again £750. After 72 holes Jimmy Adams and Tom Collinge tied on 287. In the 36-hole playoff, Adams had rounds of 68 and 69 and won by 11 strokes. It was intended to hold the 1937 Penfold Scottish Open in the Carnoustie area, just before the 1937 Open Championship which was to be played there. The R&A objected to the arrangement and the event was cancelled. Penfold resumed their golf sponsorship with the Penfold Professional Golf League in 1938.

See also
 Ladies Scottish Open

Notes

References

External links
Coverage on the European Tour's official site
Coverage on the PGA Tour's official site

European Tour events
PGA Tour events
Golf tournaments in Scotland
Recurring sporting events established in 1972
1972 establishments in Scotland